The 1970 NC State Wolfpack football team represented North Carolina State University during the 1970 NCAA University Division football season. The Wolfpack were led by head coach Earle Edwards, in his 17th and final year with the team, and played their home games at Carter Stadium in Raleigh, North Carolina. They competed as members of the Atlantic Coast Conference, finishing in fifth.

Edwards retired at the end of the season, finishing with the Wolfpack's longest tenure and most wins as coach, records which still stand today. He had a record of 77–88–8 at NC State.

Schedule

References

NC State
NC State Wolfpack football seasons
NC State Wolfpack football